The Bender Machine Works in Hayward, Wisconsin, is a dairy equipment manufacturer that played a major role in the history of the dairy farming business in the United States from the 1950s to the 1980s, producing milk pipeline and milk transfer cart components, and washing/vacuum-releasing equipment.

The company continues to be in business but now focuses its manufacturing on private label electromechanical milk pipeline washing systems.

Washer/Releaser and Step-Saver

The Bender Washer/Releaser was a vacuum-operated device first invented and patented by Lloyd Bender of Hayward, WI, USA in the 1950s, used to both wash dairy milking equipment and to transfer milk from piping containing a vacuum, into a storage tank at normal atmospheric pressure.

As a non-electric pneumatically operated device, the washer/releaser could be used on small dairy farms without electricity that used an engine to supply milking vacuum, and used well water to cool milk.

The Washer/Releaser could be used in association with both dairy pipelines and the Step-Saver, a milk transfer cart used with bucket milkers. The Step-Saver and the Washer/Releaser were once extremely common in the 1960s to 1980s on small family dairy farms in the United States, to reduce the labor of bucket milking before the milk pipeline became more popular.

Purpose and Usage 
(Expanded topic section from Dairy farming article.)

As barns began to increase in size from perhaps 6 to 12 cows to 30 or 40 cows, the bucket milker became a very laborious milking system. As the barn length increased, the farmer had to walk an increasing distance from the cow to the milk bulk tank to dump the collected milk. An early vacuum milk-transport system known as the Step-Saver was developed to save the farmer the trouble of carrying the heavy steel buckets of milk all the way back to the storage tank in the milkhouse. The system used a very long vacuum hose coiled around a receiver cart, and connected to a vacuum-breaker device in the milkhouse.

Following milking each cow, the bucket milker would be dumped into the receiver cart. A foot pedal on the base of the cart lifted the cover, which kept contaminating dust and debris out of the cart, and allowed the farmer to hold the heavy bucket milker with both hands while pouring. A diffuser plate in the top of the cart prevented milk from splashing out while rapidly pouring the milk, and a large filter disk under the diffuser removed any debris from the milk.

Milk collected in a chamber below the filter, and was slowly sucked through the long hose to the milkhouse. When empty, a large float ball in the bottom of the cart would settle down over the drain hole to seal the line and retain system vacuum. When milk was poured into the cart, the ball would float up, unsealing the drain.

An automatic vacuum breaker in the milkhouse cyclically pulled milk from the cart into a glass jar using system vacuum, followed by a release of vacuum to atmospheric pressure, allowing the milk to flow into the bulk tank by gravity flow. When the float level in the jar dropped to setpoint, system vacuum was reapplied to restart the process. Check valves on the vacuum breaker milk hose prevented milk from flowing backwards to the cart when the jar vacuum was released.

As the farmer milked the cows in series, the cart would be rolled further down the center aisle, the long milk hose unwrapped from the cart, and hung on open hooks along the ceiling of the aisle.

Wisconsin legislative code references
Use of the step saver and similar non-pipeline milk transfer systems is described in the legislative code of the Wisconsin Department of Agriculture, Trade, and Consumer Protection (DATCP).

 ATCP 60.10 Milking and milk handling systems.

 (4) NON−PIPELINE SYSTEMS. If milk from milking animals is initially collected in a portable transfer receptacle and pumped to the milkhouse through a flexible tube, rather than being pumped directly to the milkhouse through a permanently mounted pipeline, the transfer receptacle and tube system shall comply with the following requirements:

 (a) The portable transfer receptacle shall be constructed of stainless steel or an equally corrosion resistant metal, and shall have an overlapping self−closing cover. The receptacle shall be supported off the floor on a cart or mobile structure which can be easily cleaned.

 (b) The tube used to transfer milk from the portable transfer receptacle to the milkhouse shall consist of a single length of transparent tubing material. The milk transfer tube shall be supported off the floor at all times. The interior milk contact surface of the transfer tube shall be mechanically cleaned, sanitized and dried after each use. The opening through which the milk transfer tube enters the milkhouse shall be kept closed when the tube is not in use. A milk transfer tube shall not be left suspended in a milking barn or parlor between uses, but shall be stored in the milkhouse.

Continued usage of the washer/releaser
The Bender washer/releaser patents have long expired and so now anyone is free to manufacture the system components. Replacement gaskets for the original equipment, and entire new washer/releaser hardware are being produced today by other equipment companies.

Maple syrup production and sap collection
The washer/releaser has found new applications for maple syrup production. In the past, maple sap was collected using gravity flow and weeping of sap from tap holes drilled into trees. It was eventually discovered that much more sap could be collected from trees by attaching a vacuum hose to the tree, which results in higher sap collection. The vacuum collection does not appear to harm the tree.

The washer/releaser has a particular advantage that it is not electrically powered, which allows it to be installed outdoors in an extremely remote location, next to a large sap collection tank that is at normal atmospheric pressure. Only a small low-flow vacuum line needs to be provided at the collection point, with a small vacuum buffer tank to quickly restore vacuum after the releaser has emptied. (Old milk stainless steel milk bulk tanks from small dairies are similarly useful for sap collection, as the bulk tank insulation keeps the sap cold and fresh on warm sunny spring days.)

The standard vacuum for dairy use is 15 inches or 38 centimeters of mercury. A higher vacuum will cause injury and lesions to the cellular structure of cow teats. For maple application, 30 inches or 76 centimeters of vacuum does not cause harm to the tree. The original washer/releaser works fine with this much higher system vacuum.

Maple syrup requires a large ratio of sap to produce the final syrup product. Due to this, much larger versions of the washer/releaser are used for large scale sap collection. The smaller original dairy versions can also be connected in parallel to provide higher volume sap flow.

Electromechanical pipeline washing
The Bender Machine Works also developed some of the first automated "wash-in-place" milk pipeline systems, which is generally constructed similar to an automatic dishwasher with automated fill, drain, soap dispensing, and various wash cycles. They continue to manufacture these washing systems today.

Patents

Step saver related
 Automated washing system for cleaning, sanitizing, and drying flexible tubing or the like, Lloyd Bender, United States Patent 3500839, Publication Date: 03/17/1970
 Vacuum operated timing devices for fluid conveying apparatus, Lloyd Bender, United States Patent 3531217, Publication Date: 09/29/1970

Releaser and other wash equipment
 Dairy Equipment Cleaner, Lloyd F. Bender, United States Patent 2829657, Publication Date: 04/08/1958
 Dairy Equipment, Lloyd F. Bender, United States Patent 2897828, Publication Date: 08/04/1959
 Milk line cleansing system, Lloyd F. Bender, United States Patent 2987065, Publication Date: 06/06/1961
 Dairy Equipment, Lloyd F. Bender, United States Patent 3052190, Publication Date: 11/04/1962
 Dairy Equipment for pulsating milk or cleansing liquid in a fluid handling system, Lloyd F. Bender, United States Patent 3116714, Publication Date: 01/07/1964
 Apparatus for washing milk conducting lines, Lloyd F. Bender, United States Patent 3119399, Publication Date: 01/28/1964
 Fluid handling apparatus for milk pipeline washing system, Lloyd F. Bender, United States Patent 3139107, Publication Date: 06/30/1964
 Milker lids cleaning apparatus, Lloyd F. Bender, United States Patent 3173434, Publication Date: 03/16/1965
 Washer - Releaser for Dairy Equipment, Lloyd F. Bender, United States Patent 3186428, Publication Date: 06/01/1965
 Milk line releaser and washer apparatus, Lloyd F. Bender, United States Patent 3191576, Publication Date: 06/29/1965
 Fluid conveying apparatus, Lloyd F. Bender, United States Patent 3273514, Publication Date: 11/20/1966
 Milk line equipment, Lloyd F. Bender, United States Patent 3310061, Publication Date: 03/21/1967
 Fluid accumulator for milk line equipment, Lloyd F. Bender, United States Patent 3322100, Publication Date: 05/30/1967
 Fluid conveying apparatus, Lloyd F. Bender, United States Patent 3352248, Publication Date: 11/14/1967
 Fluid conveying apparatus having two-piece slide valve, Lloyd F. Bender, United States Patent 3412758, Publication Date: 11/26/1968
 Dump valve for fluid conveying apparatus, Lloyd F. Bender, United States Patent 3424098, Publication Date: 01/28/1969
 Portable, automatic washing unit for tanks, Lloyd F. Bender, United States Patent 3448742, Publication Date: 06/10/1969
 Automatic washing unit for storage tank or the like, Lloyd F. Bender, United States Patent 3583412, Publication Date: 06/08/1971
 Fluid line releaser and washer, Lloyd F. Bender, United States Patent 3658441, Publication Date: 04/25/1972
 Solenoid operated, two-way diverter valve for fluid line washing apparatus, Lloyd F. Bender, United States Patent 3670744, Publication Date: 06/20/1972
 Apparatus for automatically mixing a cleaning solution for automatic cleaning equipment for dairies or the like, Inventor: Rolyn A. Schmid, Assignee: Bender Machine Works, Inc., United States Patent 3921652, Publication Date: 11/25/1975
 Apparatus for automatically mixing and circulating cleaning solutions through dairy equipment, Inventor: Rolyn A. Schmid, Assignee: Bender Machine Works, Inc., United States Patent 4015618, Publication Date: 04/05/1977
 Mobile milk unit and system, Inventors: Lloyd F. Bender, Rolyn A. Schmid, Assignee: Bender Machine Works, Inc., United States Patent 4034711, Publication Date: 07/12/1977

References

Dairy farming technology
Articles containing video clips